Mikael Lai Rasmussen (born 1 May 1973 in Denmark) is a Danish rugby player who plays for Aarhus RK. Lai Rasmussen has 53 caps for the Danish national rugby union team.

References

1973 births
Living people
Danish rugby union players
Rugby union flankers